Fort Kom (Montenegrin: Tvrđava Kom/Тврђава Ком, German: Ostfort Crkvice) is a former fortification of the Austro-Hungarian Empire located to the east of the village and former military base of Crkvice in southwestern Montenegro. Built in 1882 and 1883, after the Second Krivošije Uprising, the primary purpose of the fort was defence against the bordering Ottoman Empire, by controlling the Crkvice area and the roads leading
to the plateau from the north and east. Fort Kom was built according to general design by colonel Karl Wahlberg.

See also
Krivošije
Fort Stražnik

References

Kom
Kotor Municipality
Krivošije